NGC 4216 is a metal-rich intermediate spiral galaxy located not far from the center of the Virgo Cluster of galaxies, roughly 55 million light-years away. It is seen nearly edge-on.

Physical characteristics 
NGC 4216 is one of the largest and brightest spiral galaxies of the Virgo Cluster, with an absolute magnitude that has been estimated to be −22 (i.e.: brighter than the Andromeda Galaxy), and like most spiral galaxies of this cluster shows a deficiency of neutral hydrogen that is concentrated within the galaxy's optical disk and has a low surface density for a galaxy of its type. This explains why NGC 4216 is considered an anemic galaxy by some authors, also with a low star formation activity for a galaxy of its type. In fact, the galaxy's disk shows pillar-like structures that may have been caused by interactions with the intracluster medium of Virgo and/or with nearby galaxies.

In NGC 4216's halo, besides a rich system of globular clusters estimated to number around 700 (nearly five times more than the Milky Way), two stellar streams that are interpreted as two satellite galaxies being disrupted and absorbed by this galaxy are present.

NGC 4216 seems to be in a place of the Virgo cluster where dwarf galaxies are being destroyed/accreted at a high rate, with it suffering many interactions with these type of galaxies.

References

External links 
 

Intermediate spiral galaxies
Virgo Cluster
Virgo (constellation)
4216
07284
39246
Astronomical objects discovered in 1784